Gary Morris Wilson (born January 1, 1970) is an American former professional baseball pitcher. He played part of one season in Major League Baseball (MLB) for the Pittsburgh Pirates in 1995.

Career
Wilson was drafted by the Pirates in the 18th round of the 1992 MLB draft. Wilson played his first professional season with their Class A (Short Season) Welland Pirates and Class A Augusta Pirates in 1995, and split his last season between their Triple-A Nashville Sounds and the Minnesota Twins' Triple-A Salt Lake Buzz in 1998.

References

1970 births
Living people
American expatriate baseball players in Canada
Augusta Pirates players
Baseball players from California
Calgary Cannons players
Carolina Mudcats players
Major League Baseball pitchers
Nashville Sounds players
People from Arcata, California
Pittsburgh Pirates players
Sacramento State Hornets baseball players
Salem Buccaneers players
Salt Lake Buzz players
Welland Pirates players
Alaska Goldpanners of Fairbanks players